Menda may refer to:

Menda (Chalcidice), town of ancient Chalcidice, Greece
Menda, Kumamoto, a village in Japan
Menda (river), a tributary of the Lena
Sakae Menda (1925–2020), Japanese exonerated defendant
Tomoki Menda (born 1990), Japanese footballer
Menda (moth), a genus of moths in subfamily Epipleminae